The Sea Fish Industry Authority (or Seafish) is a non-departmental public body in the United Kingdom sponsored by the Department for Environment, Food and Rural Affairs.  Established in 1981, and charged with working with the UK seafood industry to promote good quality, sustainable seafood. Seafish revised its mission in 2018. Its new mission is: "Seafood is the way Forward".

History
Seafish was established in the United Kingdom under the Fisheries Act 1981 through the amalgamation of the Herring Industry Board (founded in 1934) and the White Fish Authority (founded in 1951).

Seafish has its administrative base in the Scottish city of Edinburgh and has its research and development base in Grimsby, the UK's main base for the fishing industry and frozen food. The organisation in Grimsby moved into the new Humber Seafood Institute, run by the Grimsby Institute, in July 2008. It was formerly based on St Andrews Dock in Hull.

Seafish carries out research and projects aimed at raising standards, improving efficiency and ensuring the sustainable development of the industry. As well as supplying training and R&D, Seafish operates accreditation schemes for fish and chip shops, fishermen, wholesalers and processors. Seafish has an economics team which collects, interprets and disseminates data about various UK seafood sectors.

Funding
Seafish is sponsored by the fisheries departments of the four UK governments and is funded by a levy across all sectors of the fisheries and seafood industry. This levy is due on all first-hand purchases of sea fish, shellfish, and sea fish products including fish meal landed in the United Kingdom. This includes imports, which make up more than 75% of UK seafood consumption, as well as the domestic catch landed in the UK, the majority of which is exported.

Seafish services

Economics
Seafish is a source of economic information for industry and policy makers on the fishing, supply and processing industries conducting surveys and analyses of the UK fleet and processing sectors, including trends in costs and earnings and economics impact multipliers. The Economics department also produces strategic analyses such as the 'Seafood Strategic Outlook' and fleet futures modelling.

Research and development
Seafish carried out research and projects to improve efficiency and seafood quality and obtain best value for money for the UK seafood industry. The 16-strong team is based around the UK.

A number of research and development projects are funded through the Seafish Industry Project Fund. During 2006 and 2007, over £2.5 million has been invested in 47 projects which have funded research and development partnership projects, grant assistance for innovative ideas and bursaries for students.

Seafood Information Network (SIN)
Seafish has created SIN, an information portal for the global seafood industry. SIN is an internet-based data source for business, researchers and service providers. http://sin.seafish.org

Competitions

The National Fish & Chip Awards 
The National Fish& Chip Awards recognise shops for producing the best fish and chips in the UK. The competition is split into regional finals and is awarded in late January. It was first awarded in 1988.

Seafish Friers Quality Award
An approved inspector checks the fish restaurant for its image, selection of food raw materials, hygiene and cleaning, handling and temperature control, packaging, management systems, and the training schemes provided. If of a high enough calibre, this award is given, which lasts for one year, giving a reasonable indication of inherent quality. The Seafish website allows you to find recognised fish restaurants in local counties and by speciality fish being served.

Retailer of the Year
Each year a main supermarket chain is given this award. Waitrose won it in 2009.

UK Young Seafood Chef of the Year 
The UK Young Seafood Chef of the Year competition is open to all full-time and college based modern apprentice chefs.  Highly regarded across the seafood industry for the valuable experience it gives to contestants, the competition provides young chefs with a platform to demonstrate their flair, understanding, skill and ability using seafood from sustainable sources.

Launched in November 2017, teams of two are tasked with creating a three-course menu using specially selected seafood species.

Regional heats take place across the UK, where the young chefs cook their menu with the three highest scoring teams from each heat going on to compete at the Grand Final.

The prize for the winning team includes £500 for each team member, a Robot Coupe food processor and a £1,000 voucher for their college to spend on Russums catering equipment.  In partnership with the Grimsby Institute.

Seafood Restaurant of the Year 
Launched in 2015, the competition was created to find restaurants demonstrating both excellent examples of the cooking and serving of fish and shellfish, as well as evidence of fish and shellfish knowledge among their staff both front and back of house. In partnership with The Caterer. Previous winners include: The Salt Room, Brighton (2017)

Seafish Responsible Fishing Scheme
The Seafish Responsible Fishing Scheme is a BSi Publicly Available Specification (PAS 72:2006) awarded to individual vessels for vessel operations and traceability in the sea fishing industry. It specifies requirements relating to fishing practices, vessel criteria, crew competence, environmental considerations and record maintenance. It is applicable to the supply chain from the fisherman to the point of first sale. In late 2009 around 500 vessels are involved in the scheme with 325 vessels fully certified covering about 70% of UK landings by weight. The scheme is independently audited by UKAS approved auditors.

Notes

External links
 Seafish website
 Quality Award database
 Suppliers database
 Seafood Awards
 Fish Update – related website
 The stealth tax that says to hell with North Sea cod stocks

Fishing in the United Kingdom
Fishing trade associations
Fisheries and aquaculture research institutes
Organisations based in Edinburgh
Organisations based in Lincolnshire
Fishing in Grimsby
Organizations established in 1981
Department for Environment, Food and Rural Affairs
Non-departmental public bodies of the United Kingdom government
Fishing in Scotland
1981 establishments in the United Kingdom